Anthony "Tony" Nwakaeme (born 21 March 1989) is a Nigerian professional footballer and currently plays as a left winger for Saudi club Al-Fayha in Saudi Professional League.

Club career
In 2008 Tony played for Kristianstad BoIS which is a team in the lower divisions. He was already then a very solid player with outstanding skills. 
He didn’t get signed up by Kristianstad FF. He also stayed with his trainer at his home, who helped him when he got sick.

Arieșul Turda
Anthony Nwakaeme began his career in 2010 at Romanian club Arieșul Turda of the Second Division, on loan from Universitatea Cluj. He played eight games and scored five goals.

Universitatea Cluj
In January 2011, he returned to Universitatea Cluj and his most productive season came in 2011–12, when he appeared in 28 matches and scored seven goals.

Petrolul Ploiești
In the 2012–13 season, he spent the first half at Petrolul Ploiești, playing just three matches.

Return to Universitatea Cluj
In February 2013, he returned to Universitatea Cluj and appeared in ten matches and scored two goals.

Hapoel Ra'anana
On 13 August 2013, Nwakaeme signed for Hapoel Ra'anana. On 31 August, he scored a goal on his Israeli Premier League debut, a 1–1 draw against Hapoel Haifa.

Hapoel Be'er Sheva
On 24 June 2015, Nwakaeme signed to Hapoel Be'er Sheva. On 3 October 2015, he scored his debut goal for Be'er Sheva. This goal was also the debut goal in Turner Stadium.

Nwakaeme won the Israeli Premier League best player trophy in 2017.

Along with Nigerian midfielder John Ogu and Israeli strikers Ben Sahar and Elyaniv Barda, he led Hapoel Be'er Sheva to a historical series of three Israeli championship titles in a row in 2016, 2017 and 2018.

Trabzonspor
In August 2018, Nwakaeme joined Turkish Süper Lig side Trabzonspor.

International career
On 10 November 2017, he made his debut for Nigeria national team against Algeria in 1–1 draw counting for the 2018 World Cup qualifiers.

In April 2019, he said he deserved to make a further appearance for Nigeria.

Personal life
Anthony Nwakaeme is the younger brother of professional footballer Dickson Nwakaeme.

Career statistics

Honours
Hapoel Be'er Sheva
Israeli Premier League: 2015–16, 2016–17, 2017–18
Toto Cup: 2016–17
Israel Super Cup: 2016, 2017

Trabzonspor
Süper Lig: 2021–22
Turkish Cup: 2019–20
Turkish Super Cup: 2020

References

External links
 
 Player profile on Liga1.ro

1989 births
Living people
Sportspeople from Lagos
Nigerian footballers
Association football forwards
FC Universitatea Cluj players
ACS Sticla Arieșul Turda players
FC Petrolul Ploiești players
Hapoel Ra'anana A.F.C. players
Hapoel Be'er Sheva F.C. players
Trabzonspor footballers
Al-Fayha FC players
Liga I players
Liga II players
Israeli Premier League players
Süper Lig players
Saudi Professional League players
Nigerian expatriate footballers
Expatriate men's footballers in Denmark
Expatriate footballers in Romania
Expatriate footballers in Israel
Expatriate footballers in Turkey
Expatriate footballers in Saudi Arabia
Nigerian expatriate sportspeople in Denmark
Nigerian expatriate sportspeople in Romania
Nigerian expatriate sportspeople in Israel
Nigerian expatriate sportspeople in Turkey
Nigerian expatriate sportspeople in Saudi Arabia